Boomerang is a 2015 French drama film directed by François Favrat and starring Laurent Lafitte, Mélanie Laurent, Audrey Dana and Wladimir Yordanoff. It is an adaptation of Tatiana de Rosnay's novel A Secret Kept (alternative title:Boomerang). The film was released in theatres on 23 September 2015.

Cast 
 Laurent Lafitte as Antoine Rey 
 Mélanie Laurent as Agathe Rey 
 Audrey Dana as Angèle 
 Wladimir Yordanoff as Charles Rey 
 Bulle Ogier as Blanche Rey 
  as Astrid 
  as Anne-Sophie 
  as Bernadette 
 Angèle Garnier as Margaux 
 Kate Moran as Jean 
  as Clarisse 
 Rose Favrat as Rose 
 Lou-Ann Opéron as Pauline 
 Eriq Ebouaney as The psychiatrist

References

External links 
 

2015 films
2015 drama films
2010s French-language films
French drama films
Films based on French novels
Films directed by François Favrat
French LGBT-related films
2015 LGBT-related films
LGBT-related drama films
2010s French films